Chen Aichan (born August 8, 1988 at Guangzhou) is a Chinese weightlifter. She won a bronze medal for the 63 kg class at the 2010 Asian Games in Guangzhou, China, with a total of 233 kilograms. Chen raised in a peasant family in Hengli Town, Nansha District, Guangzhou. She won the 2010 Female Weightlifting National Championship and was selected into national weightlifting team.

References

Chinese female weightlifters
1988 births
Living people
Weightlifters at the 2010 Asian Games
Weightlifters from Guangzhou
Asian Games bronze medalists for China
Asian Games medalists in weightlifting
Medalists at the 2010 Asian Games
20th-century Chinese women
21st-century Chinese women